"Love Desire" is the second single from freestyle singer Sandeé's debut album Only Time Will Tell.

Track listing
US 12" single

Charts

References

1991 singles
Sandeé songs
1991 songs